Torsten Schmidt (born 9 December 1974) is a male discus thrower from Germany. His personal best throw is 64.78 metres, achieved in August 2004 in Thum.

His career highlight came when he finished ninth at the 2004 Summer Olympics. He had previously competed at the 2002 European Championships without reaching the final.

Achievements

References

1974 births
Living people
German male discus throwers
Athletes (track and field) at the 2004 Summer Olympics
Olympic athletes of Germany